Addis Mussa (born 14 September 1976), better known by his stage names Addis and Raptile, is an Ethiopian-German artist, producer and songwriter. He has performed with some American acts such as Xzibit, Strong Arm Steady and Trey Songz.

Biography 
Addis was signed to Sony BMG in Europe and sold over 250,000 units overseas (worldwide sales approx. 500,000 units). His catalogue of songs from Europe is available in the US on iTunes Global Takeover 1-4. 

His album, "Classic Material", went to number 8 on the German media control charts. His international career continued with the release of his third single, "My Everything", featuring Jamaican reggae artist Wayne Wonder, whose hit single, "No Letting Go", was top 10 worldwide in 2003.

He moved to Florida in January 2007 and is currently working on his US debut album (tba). His artist Lionezz participated in ego trip's Miss Rap Supreme, which aired on VH1 in 2008. Addis appeared on the reality TV program MTV Cribs. His song "Neva Eva" was featured in the basketball video game NBA Live 07.

Discography

Albums

Singles

References

External links 
 MonstaBlokaz community (archived)

German rappers
1976 births
Living people
German people of Ethiopian descent
Musicians from Munich